Minuscule 5 (in the Gregory-Aland numbering of New Testament manuscripts), δ 453 (in von Soden's numbering of New Testament manuscripts), is a Greek minuscule manuscript of the New Testament, on 342 parchment leaves. Using the study of comparative writing styles (palaeography), it has been dated to the 13th century.

Description 

The manuscript is a codex (precursor to the modern book), containing the entire New Testament except the Book of Revelation written on parchment (sized ). The order of books is as follows: Acts, Catholic epistles, Pauline epistles and Gospels. Within the Pauline epistles, Hebrews is placed before 1 Timothy, and Colossians precedes Philippians. The text is written in one column per page, 28 lines per page. It has marginalia.

The text is divided according to chapters (known as  / kephalaia), whose numbers are given at the margin, and the titles of chapters ( / titloi) at the top of the pages. There is also a division according to the Ammonian Sections (an early division of the Gospels into sections).

It contains tables of contents (also known as  kephalaia) before each book, and the Euthalian Apparatus (a division of the rest of the books into sections, similar to the Ammonian sections, along with lists and summaries).
According to biblical scholar Frederick H. A. Scrivener, it is a carefully written manuscript.

Text 

The Greek text of the codex is considered a representative of the Byzantine text-type. The text-types are groups of different New Testament manuscripts which share specific or generally related readings, which then differ from each other group, and thus the conflicting readings can separate out the groups. These are then used to determine the original text as published; there are three main groups with names: Alexandrian, Western, and Byzantine. Hermann von Soden classified it to the commentated Byzantine text. The Greek text of the Catholic epistles and Pauline epistles were placed by textual critic Kurt Aland in Category III of his New Testament manuscript text classification system; the Greek text of Acts he placed in Category V; and the Greek text of the Gospels he placed in Category V, but with some hesitation. Category III manuscripts are described as having "a small but not a negligible proportion of early readings, with a considerable encroachment of [Byzantine] readings, and significant readings from other sources as yet unidentified"; and Category V is for "Manuscripts with a purely or predominantly Byzantine text."

According to the Claremont Profile Method (a specific analysis method of textual data), it has mixed text in Luke 1, mixed Byzantine text in Luke 10, and belongs to the textual group 1519 in Luke 20.

In  it reads καιρω (the season) for κυριω (the Lord), a reading supported by the manuscripts Codex Claromontanus (D)*, Codex Augiensis (F), Codex Boernerianus (G), it, and Origen.

The ending of the Epistle to the Romans has verse 16:24 omitted, as also seen in codices Codex Sinaiticus, Codex Alexandrinus (A), Codex Vaticanus (B), Codex Ephraemi Rescriptus (C), Minuscule 81, 263, 623, 1739, 1838, 1962, it, vg, sa, bo, eth, and Origen.

History 

It was probably written originally in Calabria. It was used by Robert Estienne in his Editio Regia (a critical edition of the Greek New Testament), and designated by him as δ'. It was examined by biblical scholars Johann Jakob Wettstein, Johann Martin Augustin Scholz, and Paulin Martin. Biblical scholar Caspar René Gregory saw the manuscript in 1884.

It was not cited in the modern critical Greek New Testaments NA26 and NA27, but it was used by NA28.

The codex is currently located at the Bibliothèque nationale de France (Gr. 106) in Paris.

See also 

 List of New Testament minuscules
 Textus Receptus
 Textual criticism

References

Further reading 

 F. J. A. Hort, Journal of philology, Vol. 3, London und Cambridge 1871, p. 70.

External links 

 R. Waltz, Minuscule 5 at the Encyclopedia of Textual Criticism (2007)
 Online images of Minuscule 5 at the National Library of France.
 Online images of Minuscule 5 (microfilm) at the CSNTM.

Greek New Testament minuscules
13th-century biblical manuscripts
Bibliothèque nationale de France collections